Chersodromus nigrum is a species of snake in the family Colubridae. The species is endemic to Mexico.

References

.

Chersodromus
Endemic reptiles of Mexico
Reptiles described in 2018